Roberto Policano (born 19 February 1964 in Rome) is an Italian former professional footballer who played as a midfielder or as a defender for several Italian clubs.

Honours

Club
Torino
Serie B (1): 1989–90
Mitropa Cup (1): 1991

Individual
Torino F.C. Hall of Fame: 2019

References

1964 births
Living people
Footballers from Rome
Italian footballers
Italy under-21 international footballers
Italian expatriate footballers
Association football midfielders
Serie A players
Serie B players
Latina Calcio 1932 players
Genoa C.F.C. players
A.S. Roma players
Torino F.C. players
S.S.C. Napoli players
Sliema Wanderers F.C. players